Deepak Sarma (born November 8, 1969) is a professor of Hinduism and Indian Philosophy at Case Western Reserve University.

Biography 
Deepak Sarma was raised in Stony Brook, New York by immigrant non-observant Hindu parents. His father, Dr. Raghupathy Sarma, was a protein crystallographer at SUNY Stony Brook where he taught and researched in the Department of Biochemistry. While in high school Sarma largely focussed on STEM courses. Sarma began his undergraduate studies in a joint engineering and math program at Cooper Union and NYU. After taking summer courses in the humanities and social science at Berkeley, Sarma decided to change his academic orientation away from STEM. Sarma spent one more semester at NYU before transferring to Reed College. Their Sarma was able to study with Professor Edwin Gerow who guided his preliminary work in Indian philosophy and Dvaita/ Madhva Vedanta. In preparation for his BA thesis, Sarma studied in Udupi with (late) Bannanje Govindacarya, a prominent scholar of the Dvaita School. Sarma wrote his BA thesis on visesa in Dvaita Vedanta and graduated in 1991. Sarma continued his research and study at the Divinity School at the University of Chicago. He received his MA in 1993 and focussed his MA thesis on the work of Professor Jonathan Z. Smith. Just after finishing his PhD exams and submitting his dissertation proposal, Sarma had a severe accident rock climbing at Smith Rock in Oregon. Sarma recovered sufficiently to continue his work and studied in India in 1995-1997 with a 6 month fellowship from COSAS and a Fulbright-Hays dissertation fellowship. During that time Sarma studied with (late) Professor K. T. Pandurangi, at the Poornaprajna Vidyapitham with Mahamahopadhya Prof. D.Prahladacharya (now Sri Vidya Srisha Tirtharu, Pontiff of the Vyasaraja Math), and with (late) Professor Sita Nambiar. Sarma submitted his dissertation and was awarded his PhD in the Philosophy of Religions from the Divinity School at the University of Chicago in 1998 . His dissertation was supervised by Professor Paul J. Griffiths. Professors Wendy Doniger and Sheldon Pollock were also on his committee. As a graduate student, Sarma was mentored by Professor Kirin Narayan and Professor Francis X. Clooney.

Career 
Sarma has held appointments at Vanderbilt University, Connecticut College, and Yale University. A scholar of Dvaita / Madhva Vedanta, Sarma's main interests and pursuits are method and theory in the study of Hinduism, modern and contemporary Hinduism, bioethics, cultural theory, and post-colonial studies. He received a doctoral degree in the Philosophy of Religions from the Divinity School at the University of Chicago in 1998 and was among the first contemporary western trained scholars of Madhva Vedanta. His works on Madhva Vedanta include An Introduction to Madhva Vedanta (Ashgate Publishers Ltd., 2003) and Epistemologies and the Limitations of Philosophical Inquiry: Doctrine in Madhva Vedanta (RoutledgeCurzon Press, 2004).

His recent books include: Hinduism: A Reader (editor) (Blackwell Publishing Ltd., 2007) and Classical Indian Philosophy: A Reader (Columbia University Press, 2011). Sarma also writes blogs for the Huffington Post.

Sarma guest curated an exhibit of Kalighat paintings at the Cleveland Museum of Art in 2011 and even now serves as a Curatorial Consultant in Department of Asian Art.

References

External links
 

1969 births
21st-century American philosophers
Case Western Reserve University faculty
Epistemologists
Living people
Reed College alumni
University of Chicago Divinity School alumni
American academics of Indian descent